About an Inquest is a 1931 German crime film directed by Henri Chomette and Robert Siodmak and starring Annabella, Jean Périer and Colette Darfeuil. It was produced by UFA, as the French-language version of the studio's film Inquest. Such multiple-language versions were common in the early years of sound before dubbing became widespread.

It was shot at the Babelsberg Studios in Berlin. The film's sets were designed by the art director Erich Kettelhut.

Cast
Annabella as Greta Bienert
Jean Périer as the judge Conrad Bienert
Colette Darfeuil as Mella Zier
Florelle as Erna Kabisch
Pierre Richard-Willm as Paul Brent
Gaston Modot as Baumann, detective
Jacques Maury as Walter Binert
Paul Ollivier as old Scherr
Robert Ancelin as Klatte
 as concierge Zühlke
Pierre Franck as Brann
Willy Rozier
Théo Tony
Laila Bensedira as Singer

References

External links

German crime films
1931 crime films
Films directed by Henri Chomette
Films directed by Robert Siodmak
UFA GmbH films
German multilingual films
Films shot at Babelsberg Studios
Films set in Berlin
German black-and-white films
1931 multilingual films
1930s French-language films
1930s German films